Glen T. Martin (born 22 January 1944) is an American philosopher, writer, and social reformer. He is also a researcher, teacher and holds administrative positions in many institutions in USA and abroad.

Awards and honors 
2013 Gusi Peace Prize, Gusi Peace Prize Foundation, Manila, Philippines, Philosophy of Human Liberation

Books 
List of English language books:

 (1989) From Nietzsche to Wittgenstein: The Problem of Truth and Nihilism in the Modern World by Glen T. Martin, P. Lang. , 
 (1999) Seeking Balance: A Collection Of Poetry by Glen T. Martin, Dawn Dancer Press ,  
 (2004) Millennium Dawn: The Philosophy of Planetary Crisis and Human Liberation by Glen T. Martin, Institute for Economic Democracy Press. , 
 (2008) Ascent to Freedom: Practical and Philosophical Foundations of Democratic World Law by Glen T. Martin, Institute for Economic Democracy Press. , 
 (2009) Triumph of Civilization: Democracy, Nonviolence, and the Piloting of Spaceship Earth by Glen T. Martin, Institute for Economic Democracy Press. ,  
 (2011) The Earth Federation Movement: Founding a Global Social Contract for the People of Earth by Glen T. Martin, Institute for Economic Democracy Press. , 
 (2013) The Anatomy of a Sustainable World: Our Choice Between Climate Change Or System Change and how You Can Make a Difference by Glen T. Martin, Institute for Economic Democracy. , 
 (2015) One World Renaissance: Holistic Planetary Transformation Through a Global Social Contract by Glen T. Martin, Institute for Economic Democracy. , 
 (2018) Global Democracy and Human Self-Transcendence: The Power of the Future for Planetary Transformation by Glen T. Martin, Cambridge Scholars Publisher. ,

References

External links 

 
 

Living people
1944 births
American social commentators
American writers
Peace award winners